Muhammad Azwan bin Ali Rahman (bron 11 January 1992) is a Bruneian professional footballer who plays as a midfielder for DPMM FC and the Brunei national team. He is his club's current captain.

Club career
A product of Brunei's Sports School, Azwan first represented Jerudong FC in the Brunei Premier League at the age of 15. He was transferred to a national youth team  (formerly the under-16s) playing in the Brunei Premier League II in 2011 and became their captain.

Azwan moved to Indera SC in 2012 and in the following year won the inaugural Brunei Super League, scoring 17 goals (including seven in one match) to finish as top scorer.

Azwan immediately linked up with Brunei's sole professional team DPMM FC and made 16 appearances in his first season with the club. The following year, he flourished in the first team with 6 goals in 26 games, receiving plaudits from his new manager Steve Kean who claimed that he would not look out of place in any top league.

Azwan started the first half of the 2015 season in the same vein, until he was sent off for unsportsmanlike behavior in the game against Tampines Rovers on 10 May. He began the second half of the season in hot form, getting on the scoresheet in 3 consecutive home matches. However, he again saw red for violent conduct in the game against Young Lions on 23 August. The league concluded on 21 November with DPMM lifting the title.

In the 2016 season, Azwan was deployed predominantly on the left wing with Ramazotti and Paulo Sergio occupying the other attacking positions as Kean sought to defend the S.League title using a 3-4-3 formation. His 7 goals contributed to DPMM finishing in third place in a season curtailed by an ankle injury suffered in June.

Six goals in all competitions for an ever-present Azwan was still a bad return in a forgettable 2017 season where DPMM finished in 8th place. Despite a change in coach, Azwan carried his irregular form over to the next year, finding himself in a midfield three with Hendra Azam and Azwan Saleh while Iranian import Mojtaba Esmaeilzadeh occupied his left wing spot. He would later yield his midfield spot to captain Shahrazen Said but a drop in performance by Esmaeilzadeh presented Azwan with another opportunity in the starting lineup.

At the start of the 2019 Brunei Premier League, Azwan captained the first DPMM FC lineup to compete in Brunei after 14 years away. This was to be his only appearance despite being registered for the league.

Azwan scored the winner against 2019 Singapore Premier League leaders Tampines Rovers in a 2-1 victory at Hassanal Bolkiah National Stadium on 7 April. This was his first goal in the league since netting against Garena Young Lions in November 2017. He duly opened the scoring in the following fixture against Warriors FC on 20 April, a lob over the goalkeeper in the first minute, to help win the match 4–2. He performed well for the rest of the campaign, winning the league title with two games to spare come September.

In 2022, DPMM played domestically for the Brunei FA Cup, with Azwan now serving as team captain. Azwan scored six goals at the campaign, including a first-half injury time equaliser in a 2–1 victory over Kasuka FC in the final at the Track & Field Sports Complex.

When Azwan's team returned to the Singapore Premier League in 2023, he retained the captain's armband. He opened his scoring account for the campaign in a 3–4 loss to Balestier Khalsa on 10 March.

International career

Azwan was in the Brunei under-21 team that won the 2012 edition of Hassanal Bolkiah Trophy, a tournament for the national under-21 teams of ASEAN countries. He played for the Brunei under-23s at the 2013 SEA Games held in Myanmar, scoring against Laos in their penultimate game. He repeated the same feat at the 2015 SEA Games in a 1–2 loss.

Azwan made his senior debut for Brunei against Indonesia on 26 September 2012. He was included in the squad for the 2012 AFF Suzuki Cup qualification and scored his first senior international goal in the tournament against East Timor in a 2–1 win.

Azwan missed the 2016 AFF Suzuki Cup qualification games in October 2016 due to an ankle injury. He recovered just in time to be included in the Brunei squad for the 2016 AFC Solidarity Cup in Malaysia a fortnight later. Azwan came on as a second-half substitute in the first game against Timor-Leste and made an immediate impact as he broke the deadlock four minutes into his introduction, and further adding a second goal 6 minutes later. The match ended 4-0 to the Wasps, their biggest victory to date. He lasted 70 minutes in the semi-final against Macau before succumbing to his longstanding injury.

Azwan became the stand-in captain for Faiq Bolkiah at the away leg of the 2018 AFF Suzuki Cup qualifying matches against Timor-Leste on 1 September, due to take place in Kuala Lumpur. He came on at the start of the second half to replace Aminuddin Zakwan Tahir and drastically improved Brunei's play, scoring a crucial away goal in the 57th minute. However the game finished 3–1 to the team in red and black. Needing at least two goals to go through, Brunei opted for an attacking formation for the home leg in Bandar Seri Begawan. Azwan was fielded at central midfield as the captain's armband was returned to Faiq. The match finished 1–0 to Brunei, Najib Tarif scoring the winner in the 75th minute, although the Timorese came out on top 3–2 on aggregate in the end.

In June 2019, Azwan along with his brother Abdul Azizi and several other teammates had pulled out of representing Brunei at the 2022 World Cup qualification matches. This disrupted the plans of coach Robbie Servais and was one of the reasons for Brunei's elimination from the 2022 World Cup and the 2023 Asian Cup.

On 27 March 2022, Azwan captained Brunei for the friendly match against Laos away in Vientiane. He scored Brunei's first goal in a 3–2 loss for the Wasps. Later that year in September, Azwan was selected for a tri-nation tournament involving the Maldives and Laos. He came on in the second half for the first fixture, a 0–3 loss to the Maldives on 21 September, missing a penalty in the game. He also entered the game at the hour mark for Hendra Azam Idris in the second fixture against Laos six days later where the Wasps managed a 1–0 victory. 

In December 2022 he was selected for the Brunei team at the 2022 AFF Mitsubishi Electric Cup. He made three appearances against the Philippines, Indonesia and Cambodia where Brunei registered defeats in all of the matches.

International goals
Scores and results list Brunei's goal tally first.

Honours

Team
Indera SC
Brunei Super League: 2012–13

DPMM FC
 S.League: 2014 Runner-Up, 2015
 Singapore Premier League: 2019
 Singapore League Cup: 2014
 Brunei FA Cup: 2022

International
Brunei U21
Hassanal Bolkiah Trophy: 2012

Individual
 
  Meritorius Service Medal (PJK) (2012)
Brunei Super League top scorer: 2012–13
S.League Young Player of the Year: 2015

Personal life
Azwan's brother Abdul Azizi is also a Bruneian international footballer who is his teammate at DPMM FC. His cousin Hendra Azam Idris is also a teammate of Azwan.

References

External links 

 

Living people
1992 births
Association football midfielders
Bruneian footballers
Brunei international footballers
DPMM FC players
Indera SC players
Competitors at the 2013 Southeast Asian Games
Competitors at the 2015 Southeast Asian Games
Southeast Asian Games competitors for Brunei